Merata Mita  (19 June 1942 – 31 May 2010) was a New Zealand filmmaker, producer, and writer, and a key figure in the growth of the Māori screen industry.

Early life
Mita was born on 19 June 1942 in Maketu in New Zealand's Bay of Plenty. She was the third of nine children and had a traditional rural Māori upbringing. She was from the Māori iwi of Ngāti Pikiao and Ngāi Te Rangi.

Filmmaking career
Mita taught at Kawerau College for eight years, where she began using film and video to reach high school students characterised as "unteachable", many of them Māori and Pacific Islander. She learned that the film and video equipment helped her students with their education as it was a form of oral storytelling, where they could express themselves through various art forms, such as drawing and image. This experience led to Mita's interest in filmmaking. She initially started her filmmaking career by working with film crews as a liaison person, with her first documenta. Through these jobs, she discovered that foreign filmmakers had the access to tell the stories of Māori people, where she then decided to become a filmmaker herself. Mita started her technical education by having jobs as a sound assistant and a sound recordist. Over time, people started to take note of her contributions as part of the film crew. The experience eventually led her into a lengthy career in the film and television industry. Later on, she moved to Hawaii in 1990 and taught documentary film making at the University of Hawaiʻi at Mānoa.

Mita was the first indigenous woman and the first woman in New Zealand to solely write and direct a dramatic feature film: Mauri (1988). Her filmmaking has been classified as "Fourth Cinema," a term that was made by New Zealand filmmaker, Barry Barclay. "Fourth Cinema" is described as indigenous cinema created by indigenous filmmakers for indigenous audiences. Author Stephen Turner writes that the hill in Mita’s film Mauri (1988) "[...] has filmic agency. I see it as a central figure and actor, and the vehicle for the “mauri” (the principle or force of life) of the film's title [...] Fourth Cinema is a medium through which things pass, enabling people and place to be recollected and connected in the viewing experience." Through her work, Mita aimed to make films that were about decolonisation and indigenisation. She made films that represented Māori people and their culture, which were specifically made for Māori audiences. These films were made as a way to encourage young Māori and indigenous filmmakers after viewing these films, which portrayed their people authentically. In 1972, she was a co-director with Ramai Te Miha Hayward of To Love A Māori (1972). An accomplished documentary director and producer for more than 25 years, Mita made landmark documentary films such as, Patu! (1983), about the violent clashes between anti-apartheid protesters and the police during the controversial 1981 South African Springboks rugby tours in New Zealand, and Bastion Point: Day 507 (1980), about the eviction of Ngāti Whātua from their traditional land. Hotere (2001) documented the life and work of well-known Māori artist Ralph Hotere. She also directed the music video Waka for hip-hop artist Che Fu.

Acting 
Mita played the role of 'Matu' in the New Zealand feature film Utu (1983), which was directed by her husband Geoff Murphy, starred Anzac Wallace, and featured veteran Māori actor Wi Kuki Kaa. She also acted in The Protesters, a teleplay written by Rowley Habib.

Documentaries on Mita's work
In 1998, Mita was the subject of a documentary in the television series, Rangatira: Merata Mita – Making Waves, directed by Hinewehi Mohi.

In October 2014, NZ on Air announced funding for a biographical film, Te Taki A Merata Mita – How Mum Decolonised The Screen, to be directed by her son Heperi Mita, for cinematic release and screening on Māori Television. On 28 November 2018, the documentary was accepted into the Sundance Film Festival in their 2019 programme.

International influence
Mita's influence among indigenous filmmakers internationally was considerable, through film organizations and film festivals in which she mentored, such as the Sundance Film Festival's Native Film Initiative, the National Geographic All Roads Indigenous Film Festival, the Corporation for Public Broadcasting's consortium Pacific Islanders in Communications, and through her teaching at the University of Hawaiʻi at Mānoa. In 2016, the Merata Mita Fellowship was created by the Sundance Institute for native or indigenous filmmakers globally at any stage of their career or production.

Recognition and awards
Some of Mita's recognition and awards included the Amiens International Film Festival's "MRAP Award" for her documentary, Patu!, in 1983, Rimini Film Festival's "Best Film" for Mauri in 1989, Flaherty Seminar's "Leo Dratfield Award for Commitment and Excellence in Documentary" in 1996, Taos Film Festival's "Mountain Award for excellence, commitment, and innovation" in 1999, the Te Waka Toi, part of the Creative New Zealand Te Tohu Toi Ke – "Making a difference" Award (2009), and the 2010 New Year Honours, when she was appointed a Companion of the New Zealand Order of Merit for her services to the film industry. Mita was also nominated for Asia Pacific Screen Awards' "Best Children's Feature Film" with Ainsley Gardiner, Cliff Curtis and Emanuel Michael, for the film, Boy, in 2010, and for Aotearoa Film and Television Awards' "Best Director - Television Documentary" for Saving Grace - Te Whakarauora Tangata in 2011. National Geographic All Roads Festival's "Merata Mita Award" is an annual award that recognizes a "Legacy of Outstanding Storytelling" was established in Mita's honour in 2010.

Personal life
Mita had seven children: Rafer, Richard, Rhys, Lars, Awatea, Eruera and Hepi. Her 4th son Lars died as an infant 2 weeks before his 1st birthday  Her son Hepi Mita from her long time relationship with Geoff Murphy produced a documentary on his mother's cinematic legacy which was released in 2018.

Death
Mita died suddenly on 31 May 2010, after collapsing outside the studios of Māori Television.

Works
Mita directed or collaborated on numerous films and television shows, including:

Films 
The Hammer and the Anvil (1979) – Co-director, co-producer
Karanga Hokianga (1979) – Director, co-editor
Bastion Point: Day 507 (1980) – Co-director, co-editor
Kinleith '80 (1981) – Community liaison
Keskidee Aroha (1981) – Co-director, co-producer
The Bridge: A Story of Men in Dispute (1982) – Co-director, Sound
Utu (1983) – Role: Matu, Cultural Advisor
Patu! (1983) – Director, producer
Mauri (1988) – Director, writer, producer
Mana Waka (1990) – Director, sound designer, writer
The Shooting of Dominick Kaiwhata (1993) – Director, Producer
Dread (1996) – Director, writer
Te Paho (1997) – Director, writer
Hotere (2001) – Director, writer, producer
The Land Has Eyes (2004) – Executive Producer
Spooked (2004) – Producer, Second Unit Director, Role: Fred’s wife
Boy (2010) – Co-producer
Saving Grace - Te Whakarauora Tangata (2011) – Director
Merata: How Mum Decolonised the Screen (2018) – Subject

Television shows
Women - Māori Women in a Pākehā World (Episode Four) (1977) – Subject
Karanga Hokianga ki o Tamariki (1979) – Director, producer
Koha (1980-1981) – Director Producer
Titiro Mai (1980-1985) – Presenter
One of those Blighters (1982) – Role: Sue
New Streets - South Auckland, Two Cities (1982) – Research
Making Utu (1982) – Subject
Loose Enz - The Protestors – Role: Ru
New Streets - Auckland Fa’a-Samoa (1982) – Research
Koha - Mauri (1987) – Subject
Kaleidoscope - NZ Cinema, the Past Decade (1987) – Subject
Koha - Nga Pikitia Māori (1987) – Subject
Solidarity (1992) – Executive Producer
Witi Ihimaera (1997) – Interviewer, Consultant Producer
Rangatira: Merata Mita - Making Waves (1998) – Project Advisor, Subject
The Magnificent Seven (1998) – Second Unit Director
Frontseat - Series Two, Episode 10 (2006) – Subject
Kete Aronui - Merata Mita (2007) – Subject
50 Years of New Zealand Television: 7 - Taonga TV (2010) – Subject
50 Years of New Zealand Television: 2 - The Whole World’s Watching (2010) – Subject
Taku Rākau e (2010) – Producer 
50 Years of New Zealand Television: 1 - From One Channel to One Hundred (2010) – Subject
Hautoa Mā! The Rise of Māori Cinema (2016) – Subject

References

Further reading
Lamche, Pascale; Mita, Merata (1984). "Interview with Merata Mita". Framework: The Journal of Cinema and Media (25): pages 2–11. ISSN 0306-7661.
Turner, Stephen (2013). "9. Reflections on Barry Barclay and Fourth Cinema". In Hokowhitu, Brendan; Devadas, Vijay (eds.). The Fourth Eye: Māori Media in Aotearoa New Zealand. University of Minnesota Press. pp.162–178. http://www.jstor.org/stable/10.5749/j.ctt4cggdb.13.

External links
Chloe Cull, Considering Merata Mita's Legacy, in Love Feminisms, Enjoy Public Art Gallery, 2015
Brannavan Gnanalingam, A Magnificent Salvage: Mana Waka, Lumiere Reader, 2011
Biography at NZ On Screen
Watch Patu clip at NZ On Screen
Patu! background at the NZ Film Archive

Merata: How Mum Decolonised the Screen Film (Trailer) – 2018 at NZ On Screen
Sundance Institute. “Sundance Institute Announces New Merata Mita Fellowship For Indigenous Artists and 2016 Recipient.”, 2016
Alice Webb-Liddall, “Merata Mita: the godmother of indigenous film.” The Spinoff, May 2, 2021.

1942 births
2010 deaths
Companions of the New Zealand Order of Merit
Indigenous filmmakers in New Zealand
New Zealand film directors
New Zealand film producers
New Zealand Māori actresses
New Zealand Māori schoolteachers
New Zealand women film directors
Ngāti Pikiao people
Ngāi Te Rangi people
University of Hawaiʻi faculty
New Zealand women film producers
People from Maketu